Prunus pensylvanica, also known as bird cherry, fire cherry, pin cherry, and red cherry, is a North American cherry species in the genus Prunus.

Description 
Prunus pensylvanica grows as a shrub or small tree, usually with a straight trunk and a narrow, round-topped crown.

Distribution 
The species is widespread across much of Canada from Newfoundland and southern Labrador to British Columbia and the southern Northwest Territories. Additionally it is very common in New England and the Great Lakes region. It can also be found in the Appalachian Mountains as far south as northern Georgia and eastern Tennessee. Scattered growth of the pin cherry also occurs in the Rocky Mountains, south to Colorado as well as in the Black Hills of South Dakota.

Ecology 
The pin cherry can regenerate by seed and sprout. Its flowers are bisexual and pollinated by insects. Seeds are dispersed by birds, small mammals, and gravity. As part of its reproductive strategy, pin cherries seeds can remain viable in the soil for many years. Seeds accumulate over prolonged periods, and soil seed banks may be viable for 50–100 years. Asexual reproduction is achieved by sprouting, and often thickets of pin cherry plants form.

The pin cherry is rather short lived, having a lifespan of only 20 to 40 years following a rapid maturation. Its root system is shallow, with roots tending to grow laterally. It is an important food source for many animals. Winter moose browse it in the Great Lake states and boreal forest region.

Though they are documented to sprout following cutting, individual pin cherry thickets are often killed if exposed to fire. Nonetheless, they have adapted as a species by the establishment of their seed banks which are protected from the most severe heat by their soil cover and fed by the nutrients in the resultant ash residue. Following a fire or other disturbance, seeds which may be dormant for years will germinate rapidly, stimulated by the altered conditions after fire. Combined with the rapid initial growth of seedlings, these characteristics enable groupings of Pin cherry thickets to dominate many burned-over areas, particularly in the northern hardwood forest.

The pin cherry serves as food for various Lepidoptera.

Uses

Culinary
Pin cherry currently has little commercial value, though recent interest in commercial production of pin cherry fruit has emerged. The fruit is edible and can be used in jams, jellies, and preserves.

Lumber 
Pin cherry wood is light, moderately soft, porous, and low in strength giving it little commercial value. In general, it is not used for lumber and is considered a noncommercial species. It occurs in abundance, however, over a wide range of sites and produces large quantities of biomass in a relatively short time. The species has been described as well adapted to intensive management and chip harvesting on short rotations for fiber and fuel.

References

External links
 

pensylvanica
Cherries
Trees of Canada
Trees of the United States
Trees of the Northeastern United States
Flora of the Appalachian Mountains
Flora of the Great Lakes region (North America)
Flora of the United States
Natural history of the Great Smoky Mountains
Plants described in 1782
Butterfly food plants